Shades Mountain is a cuesta in Jefferson County, Alabama, United States. The mountain is bordered by Shades Crest Road to the west, Highway 150 to the south, Highway 280 to the east and Shades Creek to the north. It includes all of the neighborhood of Bluff Park in Hoover, where it summits, as well as portions of the cities of Homewood, Vestavia Hills and Mountain Brook.

Geology 
The rocks of Shades Mountain including the "Shades Sandstone" can be viewed readily from Moss Rock Preserve in Hoover, on the north side of Hurricane Creek.

Landmarks 
There is a Lovers Leap, a rock outcropping on Shades Crest Road and Brock Gap where Shades Mountain was blasted to make way for rail access. There is also the locally-known Tip Top Grill which has a view overlooking much of the area.

External links
 Shades Mountain Geography
 Friends of Shades Mountain A group devoted to protecting Shades Mountain
 Geology of Moss Rock Preserve
 Biking on Shades Mountain

Landforms of Jefferson County, Alabama
Geology of Alabama
Ridges of Alabama